Akissi Kpidi (born 3 March 1964) is an Ivorian sprinter. He competed in the men's 4 × 400 metres relay at the 1988 Summer Olympics.

References

1964 births
Living people
Athletes (track and field) at the 1988 Summer Olympics
Ivorian male sprinters
Olympic athletes of Ivory Coast
Place of birth missing (living people)
Competitors at the 1986 Goodwill Games
Goodwill Games medalists in athletics